Andrés Gómez was the defending champion, but lost in quarterfinals to Tomáš Šmíd.

Wild Card Andre Agassi won the title by defeating Luiz Mattar 7–6, 6–2 in the final.

Seeds

Draw

Finals

Top half

Bottom half

References

External links
 Official results archive (ATP)
 Official results archive (ITF)

Sul America Open Singles
Sul America Open Singles